Ulrich II (died 31 October 1221) was the 34th Bishop of Passau from 1215 and the first prince-bishop from 1217. The Bischof-Ulrich-Straße in Passau is named after him.

Ulrich was the priest of the parish of Falkenstein before serving in the chancellery of Leopold V of Austria from 1193. He then became a skilled protonotary in 1214 to Bishop Manegold of Passau.

On 21 January 1217 Ulrich was given Ilzgau by the Emperor Frederick II to hold as a banner-fief. Thus, the Emperor made him the first Prince-Bishop of the Bishopric of Passau. Ulrich II and his successors were thus henceforth rich princes ex officio. At the end of June, 1217, Bishop Ulrich inaugurated in a large feast day the first four altars of Lilienfeld Abbey. In 1219, Ulrich II allowed himself to erect on Georgsberg a castle, the Veste Oberhaus. He also founded several monasteries in the eastern part of the diocese.

Ulrich died on 31 October 1221 on the Fifth Crusade in Damietta, Egypt.

References

Bibliography
 
 

1221 deaths
German abbots
Roman Catholic bishops of Passau
Austrian abbots
Christians of the Fifth Crusade
13th-century Roman Catholic bishops in Bavaria
Year of birth uncertain